Cocoa (Theobroma cacao) production contributes to the national economy of Sri Lanka. It is grown in fairly dense shade and generally cultivated under coconut and rubber. Although cocoa production remains a source of revenue, it is no longer a main economic sector. The great part of cocoa cultivation occurs in the Matale, Kandy, Badulla, Kurunegala, Kegalle and Monaragala districts. The first cocoa plants were introduced to the country in 1819. Recent years cocoa production has increased by nearly $22.6 million (2015).

In 2019, the country ranked 30th of the largest cocoa producers in the world. In other lands shade crop such as Dadap are used. Out of two cocoa varieties, viz. Forastero and Criollo, the former is more widely grown although the quality of Criollo is better. The first cocoa plants introduce to Ceylon in early 1890. British established the first cocoa plantation in Nalanda, Matale district. Cocoa is mostly cultivated in the Central, Uva, North Central and Sabaragamuwa Provinces. Cocoa can be picked from the fourth year. The main crop is obtained from October to January, with a smaller crop in May to July. A number of diseases, viz. stem canker, pod-rot and swollen shoot tend to decrease yields. The helopeltis bug is the most serious pest and it attacks the pods causing a considerable yield loss.

References 

Economy of Sri Lanka
Agriculture in Sri Lanka
Cocoa production